Handry Satriago (born in Riau, Pekanbaru on June 13, 1969) is the CEO of General Electric Indonesia. He joined the company in 1997 as Business Development Manager. Prior to joining GE he worked for several local companies as head of business development.

He is responsible for the development and the growth of GE's business in Indonesia. Over the 15 years of working at GE, Handry has been appointed to various positions of increasing responsibility such as GE International (Business Development Manager in Indonesia and Singapore); GE Lighting (General Manager Industrial Lighting for Indonesia and Brunei); GE Power Systems (Regional Black Belt Quality Leader Asia); GE Energy (Sales Director for Indonesia, Philippines, Vietnam region) before finally promoted as the CEO of GE Indonesia.

Handy enjoys reading, sports and traveling, and was described in the Indonesian media as “The First 'Made in Indonesia' GE Leader".

Born to a family of Minang nobility, Handry was educated primarily in Indonesia. He is a member of the advisory boards of several educational institutions and in a Corporate University established by a state owned enterprise. He is an active member (aside from being a founder and an ex-Champion) of GE Volunteer Indonesia Chapter, which has been honored with several national and international awards for its contribution to society. Handry also serves as a member of the Indonesia Committee of the US-ASEAN Business Council.

Education
Handry Satriago received his bachelor's degree in 1993 from Bogor Agricultural Institute (IPB)majoring in Agroindustrial Technology, and obtained his master's degree in management (MM) from IPMI, Jakarta. He also earned dual MBA degrees from Monash University, Australia in 1997. Handry achieved his Ph.D. from the University of Indonesia in 2010, with a Doctorate in the field of Strategic Management.

His dissertation was entitled "The Influence of Leader's Followers to Performance: A Reverse Pygmalion Effect". In the dissertation, Handry explained how expectations from subordinates can influence the performance of their superiors, which is the opposite of the Pygmalion Effect whereas usually comes other way around (from superiors to subordinates).

In addition to his formal education, Handry also had the opportunity to receive informal executive education at acclaimed institutions such Harvard Business School in Boston, USA in the field of Competitiveness of Microeconomics and training in management practices from GE Crotonville in New York, United States.

Thoughts
Handry is dedicated to educational and volunteering activities. He spends his spare time in sharing sessions with students and youth from various colleges, institutes and youth communities in Indonesia to talk about his experience in leadership and management that he gained from his career over the past 20 years. This includes his time as CEO of a multinational corporation in Indonesia. Handry believes that "the job of a leader is to create other leaders". His goal is to share and to contribute to the education of the Indonesian people in order to compete globally.
In wheelchairs since the age of 17, his life is a real example of constant fight against limitations. He wrote two national bestsellers titled #sharing and #sharing2. The lessons he learned from his life, his love for education, respect for science, and passion to encourage Indonesian youth to be future leaders of the world make the book a very inspiring read. Currently he has a podcast series called #SharingHandry where he talks with leaders from different generations.

In the learning process, Handry has visited many countries and regions and he concludes that "Sungguh besar Allah yang telah menciptakan manusia yang mampu beradaptasi dengan segala kondisi di dunia ini, dan terus berupaya untuk mencari kehidupan yang lebih baik." (Almighty God has created man who is capable of adapting to all the conditions in the world, and who continuously strives to seek an even better life.)

Career
In 1997, he joined GE International as a Business Development Manager. In 1998, he moved to GE Lighting Indonesia and was assigned as the General Manager for Industrial Lighting and Systems. In mid-2001, he took the opportunity to become a Regional Black Belt in GE Power Systems Asia Pacific, and become Quality ACFC leader for GE Power Systems Asia in 2004. From 2005 until 2010, Handry led Power Generation business for GE Energy in Indonesia, Vietnam, Cambodia and Philippines. In July 2010, he was promoted as the CEO of GE Indonesia. 
 
Handry is dedicated to education and volunteerism. He is a member of IPMI Business School Advisory Board and the Chairman of GE Volunteer Indonesia Chapter (GE Team Impact 2011 and Gerald Phillippe award winner). Handry also served as governor in America Chamber of Commerce (AmCham) Indonesia and a member of the Indonesian Committee on US-ASEAN Business Council. Handry is married to Dinar Sambodja, a former colleague at GE Lighting Indonesia, now a public notary in West Java. Handry currently resides in Jakarta.

References

External links
Handry Satriago, CEO of GE Indonesia  TEMPO Interaktif, 4 December 2010. Accessed 22 July 2013.
Handry Satriago, Mengubah Keterbatasan Menjadi Kelebihan Ciputra Entrepreneurship, 20 February 2013. Accessed 22 July 2013.
Handry Satriago, President of GE Indonesia: Indonesia is our 'now' market  TEMPO Interaktif, 29 October 2010. Accessed 12 August 2013.
Handry Satriago, Pemimpin Muncul di Saat Sulit Intisari Ekstra, October 2011. Accessed 12 August 2013.

1969 births
Living people